Incredible is the second studio album by American duo Mary Mary. It was released by Columbia Records on July 16, 2002 in the United States. Originally titled The Evolution of Mary Mary, the duo reteamed with Warryn Campbell to work on the majority of the album, with Charlie Bereal, Kenny Bereal, Mike City and Rodney Jerkins providing additional production. Incredible peaked at number 20 on the US Billboard 200, selling 43,000 copies in its first week, and was eventually certified gold by the Recording Industry Association of America (RIAA). The album features the singles "In the Morning" and "I Try".

Critical reception

Tim A. Smith from Allmusic found that the project's "music aptly fits its title, Incredible. Superstar producer Warryn Campbell [...] once again works his magic. These sisters rock." Cross Rhythms editor Tony Cummings felt that "with their second project Erica and Tina Campbell cover just about every musical base – banging hip hop beats, black church rave ups, soulful ballads and funky R&B grooves while their lyrics are never less than uplifting."

Chart performance
Incredible debuted and peaked at number 20 on the US Billboard 200, selling 43,000 copies in its first week. The album also entered the top ten of the Top R&B/Hip-Hop Albums and topped the Top Gospel Albums chart. While Incredible charted higher than its predecessor Thankful (2000), it sold significantly less. It was eventually certified gold by the Recording Industry Association of America (RIAA), indicating sales in excess of 500,000 copies.

In response to the albums sales Tina Campbell elaborated in a 2005 interview: "The business of music has changed drastically since the first record. There have been huge mergers, the advent of Napster [at the time a music piracy utility], and downsizing of labels. Our second record came in the midst of all of that. When we were performing, people asked when we'd release our second album, even though it had already been out for six weeks. So I definitely think it may not have gotten the push the first one got."

Track listing

Charts

Weekly charts

Year-end charts

Certifications

References

2002 albums
Mary Mary albums
Albums produced by Warryn Campbell
Columbia Records albums